Ashvarya Shrivastava (Aiśvaryā Śrīvāstav; born 19 February 1992) is a professional tennis player from India. She formerly played for the India Fed Cup team. Her career high singles ranking is No. 653, which she achieved in October 2011. 
Ashvarya is currently training at a college in the United States.

Biography

2007–2010
Shrivastava played the first match of her career at the 2007 Sunfeast Open in her hometown, Pune, as a wildcard receiver, where she lost to British Sarah Borwell in the first qualifying round. This is her only WTA match played yet. In doubles, she partnered fellow Indian Kyra Shroff but also lost in the first round to Italian Alberta Brianti and Ukrainian Mariya Koryttseva. She currently plays for the New Mexico State Aggies where she has led the team throughout and won WAC Player of the Year 2015–2016.

2011
On 20 August 2011, Shrivastava won her first title, by winning the doubles of a $10,000 ITF event in Istanbul, Turkey, partnering German Christina Shakovets. They defeated the British pair Tara Moore and Lisa Whybourn in straight sets 6–3, 6–1 to pick up their title.

ITF finals

Doubles (1–0)

References

External links
 
 
 Ashvarya Shrivastava biography on New Mexico state sports

Living people
1992 births
Racket sportspeople from Pune
Indian female tennis players
Sportswomen from Maharashtra
21st-century Indian women
21st-century Indian people